Robert E. Meyers (December 23, 1913 – March 26, 2007) was an American politician and judge. He served as the 26th mayor of Fort Wayne, Indiana, succeeding Harry W. Baals, who died in office in 1954. A reluctant mayor, he served out the term of Baals after winning a special election and declined to run for reelection, citing the fact he went to school to be a lawyer, not a politician.

Meyers was a leader in the city's effort to annex suburban areas surrounding Fort Wayne.

In later life, Meyers served as an Allen County Superior Court Judge from 1971 until he retired from public life a second time, in 1985.

Legacy
Robert E. Meyers Park, part of Fort Wayne's Harrison Square development, was dedicated in Meyers' honor on August 14, 2009. The Meyers family contributed $300,000 for completion of the park.

References

External links
 March 27, 2007: Former Fort Wayne Mayor Robert Meyers Dies

Mayors of Fort Wayne, Indiana
1913 births
2007 deaths
Indiana Republicans
20th-century American politicians
People from Fort Wayne, Indiana